Baby is a Brixton set drama short film, written and directed by Daniel Mulloy and starring Arta Dobroshi, Daniel Kaluuya and Josef Altin.  Baby premiered at the Sundance Film Festival and went on to win multiple awards including the coveted British Independent Film Award.

Premise
A young woman (Arta Dobroshi) witnesses another woman being robbed, on a bustling London street. She watches and realizing no one else will intervene the young woman tries to stop the mugging. She bravely confronts the thief (Daniel Kaluuya) only to find that he follows her home. As their journeys continue each is revealed to be struggling with their own issues of pain and intimacy.

Development
Baby is Daniel Mulloy's follow up to his highly successful trilogy of short films that include BAFTA Award winning Antonio's Breakfast, European Film Award Nominee Dad and Slamdance Film Festival Grand Jury winner Son.

Baby was commission by Film Four and the British Film Institute as the last in their successful Cinema Extreme short film strand.

The film was based on an event Mulloy witnessed:

 I walked to the bus stop, comfortable in my own world. I was in this routine when I saw a woman being pick-pocketed. I interrupted the thief and it turned out to be a crew working together - they pulled out knives. I wanted to put the character of Sara into a similar scenario and see how power can shift.

Reception
Baby premiered at the 2010 Sundance Film Festival, to international critical acclaim and in the UK it went on to win the 2010 Edinburgh Film Festival and the British Independent Film Awards. The film received positive critical acclaim; Filmmaker wrote that the film "will haunt you well after its final frame goes dark."

Baby was ranked third most successful international short film in the world for the year 2011 by Short Film Magazine.

Accolades
 premiered Sundance Film Festival 2010
 Best Short Film British Independent Film Awards
 Golden Dragon for Best Director Kraków Film Festival  
 Grand Jury Award Edinburgh International Film Festival
 Best Film Cork Film Festival
 Best International Film Flickerfest
 Festival Prize Kansas City FilmFest
 Best Short Film St. Louis International Film Festival

References

External links
 
 

2010 films
British drama short films
2010 drama films
2010s English-language films
2010 short films
2010s British films